The 2016 Drive DMACK Fiesta Trophy is the third season of the Drive DMACK Fiesta Trophy, an auto racing championship recognized by the Fédération Internationale de l'Automobile, running in support of the World Rally Championship. It uses Ford Fiesta R2Ts.

It was also the last season of the series, as the suppliers of the Junior WRC changed from Citroen to M-Sport in 2017.

Drivers

The following drivers took part in the championship.

FIA Drive DMACK Cup for Drivers

External links
Official website of the World Rally Championship
Official website of the Fédération Internationale de l'Automobile

2016
2016 in rallying